Romford Football Club is an English football club based in Romford, London.

History
The original Romford was established in 1876. They reached the quarter-finals of the FA Cup in 1880–81, but lost 15–0 at Darwen, hampered by playing a dribbling game on a slushy pitch; Darwen also had four goals disallowed. 

There was no league football for them to play until they joined the South Essex League in 1896. An internal dispute saw several committee and players leave to form a new club in 1909, called Romford United and competing directly against Romford in the South Essex League at a ground literally across the road. The original club continued under new management and joined the Southern League while still playing in the South Essex League, but played only a single season before leaving.

The new regime at the original club proved disastrous, being expelled from the South Essex League during the 1910–11 season and subsequently folding, leaving Romford United as the only club with the town's name. They changed to Romford Town and joined the Athenian League, but finished bottom in their first season and left at the end of their second, before closing down during World War I. Romford Town had remained members of the South Essex League and returned to action after the war, but lack of support saw them withdraw in December 1920 and fold. For the rest of the 1920s the only club under the Romford name was Romford Town Thursday, playing on Thursday afternoons at Brooklands, a ground previously used by Romford's reserve team.

In 1929 the club was re-established. Taking over the use of the Brooklands stadium, they joined the London League. In 1931 they moved to the Athenian League, which they won in 1935–36 and 1936–37. Following World War II the club transferred to the Isthmian League. In 1948–49 they reached the final of the FA Amateur Cup, but lost 1–0 to Bromley in front of 100,000 spectators in the first final to be held at Wembley Stadium. In 1959 they switched to Division One of the Southern League. They were promoted to the Premier Division in their first season after finishing second, and won the Premier Division in 1966–67. The club made several applications to join the Football League, but were never successful in the elections. In 1974–75 they finished second bottom of the Premier Division, and were relegated to Division One. By this time the club had developed Brooklands considerably in anticipation of eventually being elected to the Football League and had large debts to show for it, and had to sell Brooklands in 1975 but remained until 1977. After a season of borrowing grounds to play home matches they resigned from the Southern League and folded in 1978, with the building work on a new ground barely started and hardly any money left.

In 1992 the club was resurrected for a second time and joined the Essex Senior League. They won the league in 1995–96, and in the summer merged with Collier Row (with whom they had been groundsharing since April) to form Collier Row & Romford. The new club took Collier Row's place in Division Two of the Isthmian League, which they won in their first season. In the summer of 1997 they were renamed Romford.

In 2000–01 they finished second bottom of Division One and were relegated to Division Two. After finishing bottom the following season they resigned to go back to the Essex Senior League. They returned to the Isthmian League after winning the Senior League in 2008–09, and remained in Division One North for over a decade. Despite a difficult year in 2017–18, they were able to survive despite being five points adrift with just two games remaining. The following season they found themselves in a possibly even worse situation as they were nine points short of safety with five games remaining, but staged a late recovery only to fall short on goal difference behind Witham Town. However the knock-on effect of the mid-season demise of North Ferriby United meant Romford were reprieved from relegation to fill the vacancy.

In November 2019, the club appointed former Billericay Town owner Glenn Tamplin,as manager and investor who immediately signed multiple players on his first day. Under Tamplin Romford had a difficult time, largely because of the unavailability of the waterlogged Brentwood pitch which they were unable to use after Tamplin's first match, and a huge turnover of players but eventually recovered enough ground to move off the bottom of the table in March just as the season was brought to a premature end by the coronavirus pandemic. The following season Romford moved on again to Barking but with a resurgence of coronavirus cases the season was suspended in November with Boro in mid-table then eventually curtailed in February. Shortly after, Tamplin announced he was leaving the club, but his assistants Christos Mead and Derek Duncan would remain in charge of the team.

At the start of the 2021–22 season the club announced joint managers Derek Duncan and Mark Holloway would take charge of team affairs, however they left the club in December 2021 after a disastrous run of results. Former boss Paul Martin took temporary charge, but results did not improve, and he left the club in March 2022 with Jon Fowell taking over until the end of the season. This saw the club have 4 managers during this season, signing over 100 players signed, using more than 70 players in all competitions and conceding a disastrous 154 goals in total in all competitive matches. Relegation to the Essex Senior League was confirmed on 26 March 2022, which was seen by many as inevitable.

Former Great Wakering Rovers boss Steve Butterworth was installed as manager in May 2022.

Reserve team
After being reformed in 1929, Romford entered a reserve team into Division One of the London League. During their time in the Athenian and Isthmian leagues the reserves played in the reserves sections of the leagues. When the club turned professional in 1959 they entered the reserves into the Eastern Counties League, where they spent four seasons before joining the Metropolitan League in 1963. They went on to play in the Eastern Professional Football League, which they won in 1967–68, and the Essex Senior League, where they had a single season in 1974–75.

The reformed club ran a side called Rom Valley Rangers in the Essex Business Houses League in 1992–93 but there was no reserve side after that until 1996, when a team was entered the Essex & Herts Border Combination, finishing runners-up in the Western Division in each of its first three seasons. Romford remained in that league until 2008.

In season 2009–10 Romford ran their own team in the Essex Olympian League Division 2 which they won.

In season 2012-13 the team finished second in the Essex Senior League Reserve Division West repeating the feat the following season.

At the club's Player Presentation Evening on 10 May it was announced that due to financial restraints, the Reserve and Under-18 side would not be run for the 2014–15 season.

On 8 September 2015 it was announced that the club had teamed up with Belgian 4th Division side SK Berlare with a view to working with them in the future.

Stadium
The club has led a nomadic existence, playing at seventeen home grounds during its history although most of these have been emergency arrangements when their established home ground was unavailable for various reasons. When the club reformed in 1992 it began playing at the Hornchurch Stadium, before moving to Ford United's Rush Green ground in 1995. In April 1996 they moved to Collier Row's Sungate ground, and the clubs merged during the summer. The spell at Sungate was fraught with problems and there were frequent and protracted periods when Romford had to borrow other grounds to play home matches owing to problems with the facilities at Sungate. In December 2001 they left Sungate for good and played at several different stadiums in order to complete the season. They returned to Rush Green in 2002 (as Ford United had left to groundshare with Barkingside). They remained there until 2008, when they moved to Aveley's Mill Field ground.

In 2009 it was announced that the club had been given permission to build a new stadium on the Westlands Playing Fields on London Road, however building work has yet to commence as planning permission has had to be re-applied for as the original permission expired while awaiting government approval for the change of use.

Romford began sharing with Thurrock at Ship Lane in 2012 but were required to move to East Thurrock United's Rookery Hill in 2018 when Thurrock folded and the ground was closed. This arrangement was only in place for one year however, and it was arranged for Romford to move rather closer to home for the 2019–20 season and share with Brentwood Town. In 2020 Romford announced a ground share that would involve them playing their home games at Mayesbrook Park, home of Barking.

Players and staff

Current squad

Current staff

Former players

Southern League
Premier Division champions 1966–67
Isthmian League
Division Two champions 1996–97
Athenian League
Champions 1935–36, 1936–37
Essex Senior League
Champions 1995–96, 2008–09
League Cup winners 1995–96
Gordon Brasted Memorial Trophy winners 2003–04
Eastern Floodlight League
Champions 1967–68
Essex Senior Cup
Winners 1911–12, 1931–32, 1933–34, 1937–38, 1946–47
Essex Professional Cup
Winners 1968–69
East Anglian Cup
Winners 1934–35, 1936–37, 1951–52, 1954–55, 1955–56, 1997–98

Records

Club records (since 1876)
Attendance: 17 081 vs Southall, FA Amateur Cup 4th Round (replay), 28 February 1953
Biggest victory: 12-1 vs Stork (Purfleet), F A Cup 17 September 1938
Biggest defeat: 0–15 vs Darwen, FA Cup, 5 March 1885

Player records (since 1992)
Most appearances: Paul Clayton, 396, 2006–2015
Most goals: Nick Reynolds, 74, 2010-2019
Fastest goal: Danny Benstock 11 seconds vs Great Wakering Rovers, Essex Senior League, 28 August 1995
Most goals in one season: Vinny John 45 (3 pens), 1997/98
Most consecutive appearances: Ryan Boswell 67, 19 December 2015 – 18 February 2017
Youngest player: Perry Burns (15 yrs 266 days, 29 April 06)
Oldest player: Mark Lord (48 yrs 90 days, 3 March 15)
Youngest goalscorer: Paul Burnett (17 yrs 3 days, 5 April 08)
Oldest goalscorer: John Maskell (39 yrs 5 months, 23 March 19)

References

External links

The Romford Archive

Football clubs in England
Association football clubs established in 1876
Association football clubs established in 1929
Association football clubs disestablished in 1978
Association football clubs established in 1992
Sport in the London Borough of Havering
Football clubs in Essex
Southern Football League clubs
Eastern Counties Football League
Essex Senior Football League
Isthmian League
Athenian League
1876 establishments in England
1929 establishments in England
1992 establishments in England
1978 disestablishments in England
F.C.
Football clubs in London
South Essex League